Evgueni Fanilevich Nourislamov (born August 11, 1982) is a Russian professional ice hockey defenceman who currently plays for Atlant Mytishchi of the Kontinental Hockey League.

After three seasons of junior hockey with the Drummondville Voltigeurs, Nourislamov played professionally in North America from 2003 to 2006. During the 2005–06 season, he returned to his native Russia, where he has played ever since.

References

External links

1982 births
Living people
Atlant Moscow Oblast players
Russian ice hockey defencemen
Sportspeople from Ufa